The Los Angeles Master Chorale is a professional chorus in Los Angeles, California, and one of the resident companies of both The Music Center and Walt Disney Concert Hall in Los Angeles.  It was founded in 1964 by Roger Wagner to be one of the three original resident companies of the Music Center of Los Angeles County.  Grant Gershon has been its music director since 2001, replacing Paul Salamunovich.

The Master Chorale performs about ten times per year in its own season.  It has presented more than 450 concerts, including early choral music to contemporary compositions.  Noted for presenting numerous world, U.S. and West Coast premieres, the chorus has commissioned 24 and premiered 40 new works.  The Master Chorale regularly performs with the Los Angeles Philharmonic and the Hollywood Bowl Orchestra, both at the Music Center and at the Hollywood Bowl, with such leading conductors as Gustavo Dudamel, Esa-Pekka Salonen, Zubin Mehta, André Previn, Pierre Boulez, Michael Tilson Thomas and Roger Norrington, among many others.  Notable guest conductors have included Robert Shaw, Helmuth Rilling, Margaret Hillis,  Robert Page and Richard Westenburg.  It served as the chorus for Los Angeles Opera during that organization's early years before it had established its own in-house chorus.  It also performs in community concerts throughout Southern California.

The Chorale originally performed at the Dorothy Chandler Pavilion, but since 2003 the group's principal concert venue has been Walt Disney Concert Hall.  Morten Lauridsen was its composer-in-residence from 1994 through 2001.

Leadership

Executive leadership
 Jean Davidson, President & CEO, 2015–present
 Terry Knowles, President & CEO, 2011–2015
 Terry Knowles, Executive Director, 2000-2011

Artistic leadership
 Grant Gershon, Kiki & David Gindler Artistic Director, 2012–present
 Grant Gershon, Music Director, 2001–2012
 Paul Salamunovich, 1991–2001
 John Currie, 1986–1991
 Roger Wagner, 1964–1986

Artists-in-Residence
 Eric Whitacre, 2016~
 Shawn Kirchner 
 Morten Lauridsen
 Reena Esmail

Officers of the Board
 Philip A. Swan, Chair
 Jean Davidson, President & CEO 
 Dr. Annette Ermshar, Vice Chair
 Cheryl Petersen, Vice Chair
 David Gindler, Treasurer
 Alex G. Romain, Assistant Treasurer
 Courtland Palmer, Secretary

Productions

Lagrime di San Pietro
Composed by Orlando di Lasso, conducted by Grant Gershon, and directed by Peter Sellars, Lagrime di San Pietro (The Tears of St. Peter) is an a cappella Renaissance masterpiece set to the poetry of Luigi Tansillo (1510–1568). Debuting in 2016, singers from the Los Angeles Master Chorale transform this 75-minute work into an emotional performance piece centered around the Apostle Peter accepting responsibility and the seven stages of grief that he experienced after disavowing his knowledge of Jesus on the day he was arrested. Since its debut, Lagrime has toured internationally and been presented at the Melbourne International Arts Festival, Palacio de Bellas Artes, Cal Performances, The Barbican Center, and Cité de la Musique among others. In July 2019, Lagrime di San Pietro had the prestigious honor of performing the opening concerts that season's Salzburg Festival in Austria.

Recordings

With music directors conducting
The Master Chorale has released the following recordings under Grant Gershon:
Miserere by Henryk Górecki (Decca)
A Good Understanding by Nico Muhly (Decca)
Daniel Variations by Steve Reich (Nonesuch Records)
You Are (Variations) by Steve Reich (Nonesuch Records)
 Philip Glass’ Itaipu and the world premiere recording of Two Songs to Poems of Ann Jäderlund by Esa-Pekka Salonen (RCM)
 50th Season Celebration Concert
 Festival of Carols
 David Lang:  The National Anthems and The Little Matchstick Girl Passion

The Master Chorale released three CDs under the baton of Paul Salamunovich:
 The Grammy-nominated Lux Aeterna by Morten Lauridsen (also featuring other Lauridsen works:  Les Chansons des Roses, Ave Maria, Mid-Winter Songs, and O Magnum Mysterium) (RCM)
 Dominic Argento's Te Deum  and Missa "Cum Jubilo" by Maurice Duruflé (with Rodney Gilfry as baritone soloist and Frederick Swann on organ (RCM))
 Christmas, a collection of songs (RCM)

With the Los Angeles Philharmonic
Roger Wagner, music director
 Mahler:  Symphony No. 3, Zubin Mehta conducting (London)
 Holst:  The Planets, Zubin Mehta conducting (London)
 Verdi:  Quattro pezzi sacri (Four Sacred Pieces), Zubin Mehta conducting (London)
 Verdi:  Falstaff, Carlo Maria Giulini conducting (Deutsche Grammophon)
 Verdi:  Messa da Requiem,  Zubin Mehta conducting, Gwyneth Jones, soprano; Grace Bumbry, mezzo-soprano; Franco Corelli, tenor; Ezio Flagello, baritone (Myto Records)
 Donizetti: Messa di Requiem, Leonard Bernstein conducting; Katia Ricciarelli, soprano; Agnes Baltsa, mezzo-soprano; Plácido Domingo, tenor; Samuel Ramey, bass; Robert Lloyd, bass (Deutsche Grammophon)
John Currie, music director
 Prokofiev:  Alexander Nevsky, André Previn conducting (Telarc)
Paul Salamunovich, music director
 Debussy:  Trois nocturnes and La Damoiselle élue, Esa-Pekka Salonen conducting (Sony Classics)
 Mahler:  Symphony No. 3, Esa-Pekka Salonen conducting (Sony Classics)
Grant Gershon, music director
Shostakovich (orchestration by Gerard McBurney):  Prologue to Orango, Esa-Pekka Salonen conducting (Deutsche Grammophon)
Verdi: Messa da Requiem, Gustavo Dudamel conducting; Ildebrando D'Arcangelo, bass; Vittorio Grigolo, tenor; Michelle DeYoung, mezzo-soprano; Julianna Di Giacomo, soprano (C Major DVD & Blu-Ray).

With the Hollywood Bowl Orchestra
Paul Salamunovich, music director
 Rodgers & Hammerstein, The King & I,	John Mauceri conducting (Phillips Classics)
 Schoenberg/Ravel, Earth Day, John Mauceri conducting (Phillips Classics)
 Hollywood Nightmares (various composers), John Mauceri conducting (Phillips Classics)

Motion pictures
Salamunovich also conducted the Los Angeles Master Chorale on the soundtracks of numerous major motion pictures, including A.I. Artificial Intelligence, My Best Friend's Wedding, Bram Stoker's Dracula, The Sum of All Fears and Waterworld. Gershon conducted the Chorale on the soundtracks for the motion pictures Lady in the Water, License to Wed, Charlie Wilson's War, I Am Legend, and Star Wars: The Last Jedi.

Awards and recognition
In June 2003, the Master Chorale received the prestigious ASCAP/Chorus America Award for Adventurous Programming. In 2008, one of the Chorale's highly successful outreach program, “Voices Within,” earned the coveted Chorus America Education Outreach Award. The Master Chorale with Paul Salamunovich conducting, received a Grammy nomination for Best Choral Performance for the recording Lux Aeterna  in 1998.

Education programs
Since 1990, the Master Chorale has held the Los Angeles Master Chorale High School Choir Festival, one of the largest high school choir festivals in the nation.

"Voices Within," another of the Chorale's highly successful outreach programs, is an in-depth, ten-week, in-school residency program for middle and high school students that helps children who have little or no musical background to “find their voices.”  With the assistance of a teaching artist, lyricist, and composer who work with teams of students in the classroom, children write music and lyrics to create original songs.

The Master Chorale provides education outreach to approximately 13,000 children each year.

References

External links
Official website
Information on Los Angeles Philharmonic website
 Information on Los Angeles Music Center Website  Music Center | TMC Offstage

Choirs in California
Musical groups from Los Angeles
1964 establishments in California
Musical groups established in 1964